Keep No Score is the third full-length studio album by alternative rock band Sleeping at Last. It was released independently in 2006.

Track listing

References

Sleeping at Last albums
2006 albums